Lodgepole Creek is a stream in the U.S. state of South Dakota.

The creek took its name from nearby Lodgepole Butte, where lodgepole pine grew.

References

Rivers of Perkins County, South Dakota
Rivers of South Dakota